Hanbarwadi is a village in Belgaum district in the southern state of Karnataka, India.

Hanbarwadi has population of around 1000.  This village is a part of Kognolli Gram Panchayat.  The cast prevailing in the village is Hanbar. Village has a two temples, one is of Hanuman and other one is of Lakshmi.  Mallikarjun temple is about 2 km from the village.  The famous Datta Mandir is about 1.5 km from the village.

References

Villages in Belagavi district